Gravity is an album by the hip hop group Da Bush Babees, released in 1996. The crew got help from a number of fellow Native Tongues members, including the Ummah, Mos Def and De La Soul's Posdnous. The lead single "The Love Song" received strong airplay prior to the album's release. Along with De La Soul's Stakes Is High, Gravity is notable for jump-starting the hip-hop career of Mos Def, who is featured on three tracks on the album ("Intro," "The Love Song," and "S.O.S."). Warner Bros. released the group from its contract after the album ran its course.

Critical reception
The Dayton Daily News wrote that "Wax" "is a cool, jazzy, danceable number that should get plenty of club play among youth and adult-oriented audiences." The Staten Island Advance called "3 MCs" "a kinetic old-school combination of microphone-tossing routines."

Track listing

Album chart positions

Singles chart positions

References

1996 albums
Da Bush Babees albums
Albums produced by Q-Tip (musician)
Warner Records albums